Dawn in Pichincha (Spanish:Amanecer en el Pichincha) is a 1950 Ecuadorian drama film directed by Alberto Santana and starring Paul Feret, Martha Jácome and Salomón Rosero. It was the second sound film to be made in Ecuador following They Met in Guayaquil which was released the previous year.

Cast
 Paul Feret
 Martha Jácome
Salomón Rosero

References

Bibliography 
 Handelsman, Michael. Culture and Customs of Ecuador. Greenwood Publishing Group, 2000.

External links 
 

1950 films
1950 drama films
Ecuadorian drama films
1950s Spanish-language films
Films directed by Alberto Santana
Films set in Ecuador
Ecuadorian black-and-white films